Randall S. Kiper, more known as Kyper, is an American rapper, D.J. and actor based in Baton Rouge, Louisiana, United States. His success occurred in the early 1990s with a string of club hits including "Conceited", "What Gets Your Body Hyped (XTC)", "Tic-Tac-Toe", "Throw Down", and "Spin the Bottle". His biggest hit to date is "Tic-Tac-Toe," which charted on the Billboard Top 40 in the summer of 1990, selling over one million copies and peaking at No. 14. It was ranked No. 100 on the Billboard Year-End Hot 100 singles of 1990.  The track sampled instrumental passages from "Owner of a Lonely Heart" by Yes.  It also sampled "Planet Rock" by Afrika Bambaataa and Soul Sonic Force among others.

Albums

Singles

References

External links
Kyper @ MySpace
Kyper @ Discogs

Musicians from Baton Rouge, Louisiana
Rappers from Louisiana
Living people
21st-century American rappers
Year of birth missing (living people)
20th-century American rappers